John Liscio (1949 – November 29, 2000) was an American journalist covering finance and the economy as well as an independent financial analyst. He was the founder of the influential bond market newsletter, The Liscio Report.

Liscio was born to Armand and Josephine Liscio in Manhattan and matriculated from Fordham Preparatory School in the Bronx to Fordham University where he earned a bachelor's degree. He served in the Marine Corps before becoming a financial writer and analyst in the late 1970s. He was a senior editor at U.S. News & World Report and worked at Barron's in the late 1980s into the early 1990s. In 1992 he started The Liscio Report, a financial newsletter that became influential on Wall Street and especially so among bond traders. Upon his death in 2000 the newsletter was continued by trusted associates Doug Henwood and Phillipa Dunne.

Liscio died, aged 51, on November 29, 2000, at Mount Sinai Hospital in Manhattan from liver and kidney failure complications due to a hepatitis C infection. He was survived by his wife, Frances Pelzman Liscio, a humor writer, two preadolescent children, both his parents, and a sister.

References

External links
 The Liscio Report on the Economy (blog)

American male journalists
American magazine editors
American business and financial journalists
American financial analysts
American finance and investment writers
1949 births
2000 deaths
Fordham University alumni
20th-century American non-fiction writers
20th-century American male writers
Fordham Preparatory School alumni